Jonathan Kennedy (born 30 November 1980) is an English former professional footballer who played as a goalkeeper for Sunderland.

References

1980 births
Living people
Footballers from Rotherham
English footballers
Association football goalkeepers
Worksop Town F.C. players
Sunderland A.F.C. players
Blackpool F.C. players
Gateshead F.C. players
Accrington Stanley F.C. players
Witton Albion F.C. players
Halifax Town A.F.C. players
Lancaster City F.C. players
Droylsden F.C. players
FC Halifax Town players
English Football League players